Bolshakovo (or  (1938-1946)), also referred to as Bolshakovo-Novoye, is a settlement located in the southern part of Slavsky District of Kaliningrad Oblast, Russia, 90 km from Kaliningrad. The adjective "Novoye" (new) is sometimes used to distinguish it from an eponymous village in Ivanovo Oblast of Russia.

It is situated on the road from Talpaki to Sovetsk.  There are also roads from Bolshakovo to Polessk and to Chernyakhovsk.  Bolshakovo is a railway station on the Kaliningrad–Sovetsk line.

Bolshakovo lies on the border of Polessk Lowland in a marsh landscape and has approximately 2,000 inhabitants.

Bolshakovo is a transmission site of the Voice of Russia broadcasting station, the Bolshakovo transmitter.

History
In 1454, the region was incorporated by King Casimir IV Jagiellon to the Kingdom of Poland upon the request of the anti-Teutonic Prussian Confederation. After the subsequent Thirteen Years' War, since 1466, it formed part of Poland as a fief held by the Teutonic Order, and from 1525 held by Ducal Prussia. From the 18th century it was part of the Kingdom of Prussia, and from 1871 to 1945 it was also part of Germany, within which it was administratively located in the Landkreis Elchniederung (district) in the Province of East Prussia. In the late 19th century, the village had 147 houses and 731 inhabitants. The population was employed in agriculture and cattle and horse breeding. In 1938, during a massive Nazi campaign of renaming of placenames, it was renamed to Kreuzingen to erase traces of Lithuanian origin. Until the end of World War II, the biggest livestock railway station of Germany was located there. Following the war, it fell to the Soviet Union.

References

External links
 Kreuzingen on a 1930s map of East Prussia

Rural localities in Kaliningrad Oblast